The Day is the fourth studio album by American R&B singer Babyface. It was  released by Epic Records on October 22, 1996, in the United States. The album peaked at number 6 on the US Billboard 200 and number 4 on the Top R&B/Hip-Hop Albums, also reaching the top ten on the Dutch Albums Chart. The Day was certified double platinum  by the Recording Industry Association of America (RIAA), and received Grammy Award nominations for Album of the Year and Best R&B Album respectively.

From the album, the track "Every Time I Close My Eyes" was nominated for Best Male Pop Vocal Performance. A duet with Stevie Wonder, titled "How Come, How Long", was also Grammy nominated for Best Pop Collaboration with Vocals. Additionally, the singles "This Is for the Lover in You" and "Every Time I Close My Eyes" both reached number 6 on the US Billboard Hot 100.

Critical reception

AllMusic editor Leo Stanley found that The Day "confirms his skill for subtle, inventive songwriting and accessible, polished yet soulful production [...] He is still compelling – his voice is as smooth as silk, and nearly as seductive – but it doesn't quite have the force of personality as his greatest productions. Nevertheless, The Day qualifies as state-of-the-art mid-'90s soul, featuring a handful of terrific songs, and a lot of extremely pleasurable filler." David Browne from Entertainment Weekly wrote that on the album, Babyface "immerses himself in the same hot-tub soul he's applied to everyone from Toni Braxton to Eric Clapton. All the Babyface trademarks — the crisp, unobtrusive percussion, the silky guitars, the harmonies that blanket the melodies like a quilt — are laid out like a three-piece suit. But more so than any previous album he’s made, The Day is chockful of luscious, gently persuasive songs, from doe-eyed testimonials to his devotion to misty childhood reminiscences.

Track listing

Notes
  denotes a co-producer
  denotes an additional producer

Personnel
Credits adapted from the album's liner notes.

 Engineered by Brad Gilderman and Thom Russo
 Mixed by Jon Gass, Mick Guzauski and Bob Brockmann
 Strings on "The Day" engineered by Humberto Gatica
 Background vocals on "Every Time I Close My Eyes" engineered by Mike Scott
 Mastered by Eddy Schreyer at Oasis Mastering
 MIDI Programmer: Randy Walker
 Production coordinator: Ivy Skoff
 Art direction: Bennet/Novak and company
 Design: Vincent Oto
 Booklet and Spike Photography: Anton Corbijn
 Cover photography: Beisig and Taylor
 Styling: Bernard C. Jacobs
 Grooming: Melvonne
 Hair: Tim Carter

Charts

Weekly charts

Year-end charts

Certifications

References

Babyface (musician) albums
1996 albums
Albums produced by Babyface (musician)